Established in 1952, the Aga Khan Hospital in Kisumu is a 76-bed acute care facility. The hospital provides general medicine services, specialist clinics and high-tech diagnostic services and has an emergency Casualty Department. It is part of the Aga Khan Health Services international referral system with links to Aga Khan University Hospital, Nairobi and Aga Khan University Hospital, Karachi.

History
The foundation for the Aga Khan Dispensary and Maternity Home was laid on 26 February 1951, by Prince Aly Khan, and the facility opened in 1952 as an 8-bed general ward.

In 1960, the dispensary was extended to incorporate two general wards with a total of 17 beds and an outpatient department. A small laboratory was established in 1975 and a portable X-ray machine purchased. By 1979, the average bed occupancy was over 100 percent, which indicated a need for expansion.

In 1991, the hospital had 55 beds, piped oxygen gas was available, an administration block was completed and physiotherapy services were introduced. By 1992 the bed capacity had increased to 76 with a paediatric ward, a VIP wing and an acute care unit.

See also
Aga Khan Development Network

References

Hospital buildings completed in 1952
Kisumu
Aga Khan Kisumu
Kisumu